Clyde Elias "Chad" Kimsey (August 6, 1906 – December 3, 1942) was a Major League Baseball pitcher. He was killed in a truck accident at age 36.

Kimsey was a strong hitting pitcher in his major league career. He posted a .282 batting average (58-for-206) with 30 runs, 6 home runs and 26 RBI in 227 games. He was used as a pinch hitter 43 times in the major leagues. He made 26 pinch hitting appearances for the 1930 St. Louis Browns.

References

External links
Clyde Elias “Chad” Kimsey (1906-1942) - Find A Grave-gedenkplek

Major League Baseball pitchers
St. Louis Browns players
Chicago White Sox players
Detroit Tigers players
Muskogee Chiefs players
Tulsa Oilers (baseball) players
Montreal Royals players
Baltimore Orioles (IL) players
Baseball players from Tennessee
Road incident deaths in Oklahoma
1906 births
1942 deaths
Truck road incident deaths